Saiyuki: Requiem or  is the first animated film adaptation of the anime and manga series Saiyuki produced by Pierrot. The film directed by Hayato Date and written by Katsuyuki Sumisawa and composed by Motoi Sakuraba. the film was first released in Japanese theaters on August 18, 2001. The movie domestic released in DVD/VHS on August 8, 2002.

On July 3, 2004 ADV Films licensed Saiyuki: Requiem and the DVD was release in North America on January 18, 2005, title "Saiyuki: Requiem - The Motion Picture". also Madman Entertainment Distribute in Australia and New Zealand. The ending Theme performed by Tetsu 69 title "Tightrope".

Plot
The gang is traveling along when they find a girl in need. Of course, they all can't resist going after her. This girl isn't all that she seems... her motive or her "humanity", Eventually, Hakkai sends the jeep into the forest, trying to escape their assailant in the sky. Sanzo starts to make a suggestion, but both Hakkai and Gojyo shoot down his idea, which apparently was to get rid of the girl. They then suggest to Sanzo that he could take care of it. After some pleading, Sanzo agrees. He first tries his banishing gun, which doesn't work. Then he tries Makai Tenjo. While it doesn't destroy the bird, it does force it to back off.  and soon the whole gang has Sanzo's past on their hands and one certain young boy who can keep a grudge for decades

Voice cast

sales 
The Saiyuki: Requiem managed to reach only the 10th highest grossing spot in the box office rankings during its theatrical release. While the Saiyuki movie earned under 2 million dollars theatrically, live action Japanese films brought in more than double that amount during the same weeks, and competing American films like A.I. and Planet of the Apes brought in as much as $80 million. While Saiyuki's $2 million box office may be considered respectable for an anime feature.

Reception
Otaku News praised the film and said that "Saiyuki: Requiem is a hugely enjoyable film, it’s hard to tackle such a classic style story and so it well but Saiyuki does with buckets of style .It’s very hard to make a film work especially when based on such a long running series but it more tha stands on  own. Saiyuki: Requiem is essential viewing for fans of fantasy and shonen action". Animation UK describes the film as such  "the quality and scope of the film is evident from start to finish, and there is a real cinematic feel to the film throughout.  The animation is noticeably good, as is the music, and the plot is well laid out, drawing you in and tripping you up on occasion.  The film is highly enjoyable, with plenty of action and some flashes into the characters' tortured pasts.  It even finds time to bring in the excellent Kougaiji and his followers, but in a way that's the film's problem".

Gensomaden Saiyuki: Kibou no Zaika
Gensomaden Saiyuki: Kibou no Zaika (OAV) was produced by the same company and distribute by Geneon September 19, 2002 . Sentai Filmworks get the licensed in 2011.

"Kibou no zaika" was originally interactive game. The company that released DVD, extracted only anime scenes to the DVD which caused little pause between every scene change.

References

External links
 

2001 anime films
Saiyuki (manga)
Saiyuki
2000s Japanese-language films